Neil Campbell is a comedian, actor, writer, and producer, who served as artistic director of the Upright Citizens Brigade Theatre in Los Angeles, CA from 2008 to 2012. Campbell has worked as a producer and writer on shows including Comedy Bang! Bang! and Brooklyn Nine-Nine.

Early life 
Campbell attended the University of Iowa, where he met frequent collaborator, Paul Rust.

Career
Campbell has written and performed at the Upright Citizens Brigade Theatre in Los Angeles, CA since it opened in 2005, and served as artistic director from 2008 to 2012. Campbell often performed with actor Paul Rust at the Upright Citizens Brigade Theatre, including co-hosting the long-running Not Too Shabby open-mic sketch show.

Campbell served as an executive producer, writer, and actor on IFC's Comedy Bang! Bang! Campbell wrote for the 2015 Primetime Emmy Awards with the entire Comedy Bang! Bang! writing staff. Campbell has been a supervising producer on Brooklyn Nine-Nine since 2017. He also had a recurring role on the Netflix show Love as Kyle.

Filmography

References

External links

Living people
21st-century American comedians
American television producers
University of Iowa alumni
Upright Citizens Brigade Theater performers
Year of birth missing (living people)